El Salvador is a member of the United Nations and several of its specialized agencies, the Organization of American States (OAS), the Central American Common Market (CACM), the Central American Parliament (PARLACEN), and the Central American Integration System (SICA). It actively participates in the Central American Security Commission (CASC), which seeks to promote regional arms control.

In November, 1950 El Salvador helped the newly empowered 14th Dalai Lama by supporting his Tibetan Government cabinet minister's telegram requesting an appeal before the General Assembly of the United Nations to stop the Communist China's People's Liberation Army's invasion of Tibet.

El Salvador also is a member of the World Trade Organization and is pursuing regional free trade agreements. An active participant in the Summit of the Americas process, El Salvador chairs a working group on market access under the Free Trade Area of the Americas initiative.

El Salvador has joined its six Central American neighbors in signing the Alliance for Sustainable Development, known as the Conjunta Centroamerica-USA or CONCAUSA to promote sustainable economic development in the region.

Bilateral relations

Africa

Americas

Asia

Europe

Oceania

See also
 List of diplomatic missions in El Salvador
 List of diplomatic missions of El Salvador

References